The 1984–85 North West Counties Football League was the third in the history of the North West Counties Football League, a football competition in England. Teams were divided into three divisions.

Division One

Division One featured 2 new teams:

 Fleetwood Town promoted as champions from Division Two
 Eastwood Hanley promoted as runners-up from Division Two

League table

Division Two

Division Two featured 4 new teams:

 Ashton United, relegated from Division One
 Darwen, relegated from Division One
 Clitheroe promoted as champions from Division Three
 Padiham promoted as runners-up from Division Three

League table

Division Three

Division Three featured 3 new teams:

 Lytham, relegated from Division Two
 Kirkby Town
 Colwyn Bay, joined from Welsh League (North)

League table

Promotion and relegation

Division One
Caernarfon Town moved to the Northern Premier League while Lancaster City were relegated to Division Two.

Division two
Division Two champions Clitheroe and second placed Irlam Town were promoted to Division One while Padiham were relegated to Division Three.

Division Three
Division Three champions Kirkby Town and second placed Colwyn Bay were promoted to Division Two while Urmston Town, Lytham and Ashton Town left the League at the end of the season and were replaced by newly admitted Huyton Town. Oldham Dew changed their name to Oldham Town.

External links 
 North West Counties Football League Tables at RSSSF

North West Counties Football League seasons
7